Natalja Jonckheere (born 21 October 1970) is a retired Belgian high jumper.

She finished ninth at the 1988 World Junior Championships, tenth at the 1989 European Indoor Championships. twelfth at the 1989 World Indoor Championships, ninth at the 1995 World Indoor Championships and tenth at the 1998 European Indoor Championships. She also competed at the 1994 European Championships and the 1995 World Championships without reaching the final.

She became Belgian champion in 1988, 1991, 1994 and 1995. Her main domestic competitor was Sabrina De Leeuw. Her personal best jump is 1.95 metres, achieved in July 1995 in Norderney.

References

1970 births
Living people
Belgian female high jumpers
Universiade medalists in athletics (track and field)
Universiade bronze medalists for Belgium